Johana Patricia Arrieta Madera (born 2 September 1998 in Montería) is a Colombian middle-distance runner competing primarily in the 800 metres. She represented her country in the 800 metres at the 2017 World Championships without reaching the semifinals. In addition, she won the gold medal at the 2017 South American Championships.

International competitions

Personal bests

Outdoor
400 metres – 56.67 (Medellín 2017)
800 metres – 2:05.39 (Medellín 2016)
1500 metres – 4:35.78 (Medellín 2017)

References

1998 births
Living people
Colombian female middle-distance runners
World Athletics Championships athletes for Colombia
People from Montería
Athletes (track and field) at the 2018 South American Games
Pan American Games competitors for Colombia
Athletes (track and field) at the 2019 Pan American Games
21st-century Colombian women